Stilwell-Westbrook Stone House is a historic home located at Rochester in Ulster County, New York.  It is a -story, five-bay stone dwelling built about 1750. Changes in the early 19th century added Greek Revival details. Also on the property is a large privy dated to about 1880.

It was listed on the National Register of Historic Places in 1999.

References

Houses on the National Register of Historic Places in New York (state)
Houses completed in 1750
Houses in Ulster County, New York
National Register of Historic Places in Ulster County, New York